Streptococcus tigurinus is a novel member of the genus Streptococcus that was first discovered in 2012 by Swedish researchers.

Identification
Streptococcus tigrinus is a member of the Gram-positive bacteria family Streptococcaceae and is identifiable by its 16S ribosomal RNA gene analysis. S. tigurinus was initially difficult to study due to its similarity to other bacteria causing it to go unnoticed, but it has recently been identified as being the most structurally related to Streptococcus mitis, Streptococcus pneumoniae, Streptococcus pseudopneumoniae, Streptococcus oralis, and Streptococcus intermedius .

Pathogenesis
Streptococcus tigurinus is generally not a normal part of the human bacteria flora and it is currently unknown where its natural habitat is or its potential for colonization. Capable of causing serious infections if it manages to enter the body's bloodstream, usually through open wounds in the mouth, it was first discovered to cause invasive infections after it was isolated from a patient with infective endocarditis. It was later detected in the blood and cerebrospinal fluid of 14 other patients with varying types of serious invasive infections such as spondylodiscitis, bacteremia, meningitis, and empyema.

Treatment
As S. tigurinus is relatively rare, scientists are still researching the most effective ways to combat the bacterium, with some strains showing resistance to drugs like tetracycline and an enhanced resistance to phagocytosis by macrophages.

References

External links
 Type strain of Streptococcus tigurinus at BacDive -  the Bacterial Diversity Metadatabase

Streptococcaceae
Gram-positive bacteria